Michele Conti (born 3 March 1970) is an Italian politician.

He was a member of right-wing party National Alliance from 1994 to 2005 and he served as municipal councillor in Pisa. He ran for Mayor of Pisa at the 2018 Italian local elections, supported by a centre-right coalition formed by Lega Nord, Forza Italia and Brothers of Italy. He won and took office on 27 June 2018.

See also
2018 Italian local elections
List of mayors of Pisa

References

External links
 
 

1970 births
Living people
Mayors of Pisa
Lega Nord politicians